Saranyu Intarach (born 29 June 1989), simply known as Ta, is a Thai professional footballer who plays as a right back for Thai League 2 club Udon Thani.

Honours

Club
Police United
 Thai Division 1 League: 2009, 2015
PT Prachuap FC
 Thai League Cup: 2019

External links
 Profile at Goal

1989 births
Living people
Saranyu Intarach
Saranyu Intarach
Association football defenders
Saranyu Intarach
Saranyu Intarach
Saranyu Intarach
Saranyu Intarach
Saranyu Intarach